The premium business model is the concept of offering high end products and services appealing to discriminating consumers. Brand image is an important factor in the premium business model, as quality is often a subjective matter. This business model seeks a higher profit margin on a lower sales volume.

Examples of this model include Rolls-Royce, BMW and Mercedes-Benz in the auto industry, Gucci bags and Rolex watches in the luxury accessories industry, and elite personal services such as using a chauffeur. 

Business models